Fabrício Carpi Nejar  or Fabricio Carpinejar (born October 23, 1972 ) is a Brazilian writer. He was born in Caxias do Sul,  Rio Grande do Sul. His father is the poet Carlos Nejar.

Bibliography 
1998 - As solas do sol
2000 - Um terno de pássaros ao sul
2001 - Terceira sede
2002 - Biografia de uma árvore
2003 - Caixa de sapatos (antologia)
2004 - Cinco Marias
2004 - Porto Alegre e o dia em que a cidade fugiu de casa (Série Paralelepípedos 2)
2005 - Como no céu/Livro de visitas
2006 - O Amor Esquece de Começar
2006 - Filhote de Cruz Credo
2006 - Meu filho, minha filha
2008 - Diário de um apaixonado - Sintomas de um bem incurável
2008 - Canalha
2009 - www.twitter.com/carpinejar
2010 - Mulher perdigueira
2010 - O menina grisalho
2011 - Borralheiro
2011 - A menina superdotada
2012 - Beleza Interior - Uma viagem poética pelo Rio Grande do Sul
2012 - Ai meu Deus, Ai meu Jesus
2012 - Bem-vindo - Histórias com as cidades de nomes mais bonitos e misteriosos do Brasil

External links 
Fabrício Carpi Nejar in English
Poetry Fabricio Carpinejar in Portuguese

1972 births
Living people
Brazilian male writers
Brazilian writers